Raymond White (born 5 February 1941) is an English former professional footballer who played in the Football League for Millwall.

Career
White was born in Ely, Cambridgeshire and began his career with Millwall playing twice for the Lions in the 1958–59 season. He joined Second Division side Stoke City in 1960 but only played a few reserve team matches before deciding to pursue a different career.

Career statistics
Source:

References

1941 births
Living people
English footballers
Association football midfielders
English Football League players
Millwall F.C. players
Stoke City F.C. players